Hulamin is a South African company based in Pietermaritzburg that specialises in rolled aluminium products for precision and high technology applications. The company supplies a significant proportion of the world's ultra high-end aluminium products. It is known for being a key supplier of worked aluminium components for Tesla electric vehicles and aeronautical Wi-Fi components.

In 2018/19 the company was negatively effected by cheaper Chinese imports into its South African market, higher tariffs on its exports to the United States, reduced demand from the automotive industry, and has faced criticism for high executive overheads.

References

Companies listed on the Johannesburg Stock Exchange
Engineering companies of South Africa
Companies based in KwaZulu-Natal
Pietermaritzburg
Aluminium companies
South African brands